This list contains the species in the order Soricomorpha. Soricomorpha is no longer considered a valid taxon; it is now known to be paraphyletic, since erinaceids are the sister group of shrews.

Family Solenodontidae, solenodons
 Genus Solenodon, solenodons
 Cuban solenodon, Solenodon cubanus
 Hispaniolan solenodon, Solenodon paradoxus

Family Soricidae, shrews

Subfamily Crocidurinae, white-toothed shrews
 Genus Crocidura, white-toothed shrews
 Cyrenaica shrew, Crocidura aleksandrisi
 East African highland shrew, Crocidura allex
 Andaman shrew, Crocidura andamanensis
 Ansell's shrew, Crocidura ansellorum
 Arabian shrew, Crocidura arabica
 Jackass shrew, Crocidura arispa
 Armenian shrew, Crocidura armenica
 Asian gray shrew, Crocidura attenuata
 Hun shrew, Crocidura attila
 Bailey's shrew, Crocidura baileyi
 Kinabalu shrew, Crocidura baluensis
 Bates's shrew, Crocidura batesi
 Mindanao shrew, Crocidura beatus
 Beccari's shrew, Crocidura beccarii
 Bottego's shrew, Crocidura bottegi
 Bale shrew, Crocidura bottegoides
 Thick-tailed shrew, Crocidura brunnea
 Buettikofer's shrew, Crocidura buettikoferi
 African dusky shrew, Crocidura caliginea
 Canarian shrew, Crocidura canariensis
 Caspian shrew, Crocidura caspica
 Cinderella shrew, Crocidura cinderella
 Congo white-toothed shrew, Crocidura congobelgica
 Long-footed shrew, Crocidura crenata
 Crosse's shrew, Crocidura crossei
 Reddish-gray musk shrew, Crocidura cyanea
 Dent's shrew, Crocidura denti
 Desperate shrew, Crocidura desperata
 Dhofar shrew, Crocidura dhofarensis
 Long-tailed musk shrew, Crocidura dolichura
 Doucet's musk shrew, Crocidura douceti
 Dsinezumi shrew, Crocidura dsinezumi
 Eisentraut's shrew, Crocidura eisentrauti
 Elgon shrew, Crocidura elgonius
 Elongated shrew, Crocidura elongata
 Heather shrew, Crocidura erica
 Fischer's shrew, Crocidura fischeri
 Greater red musk shrew, Crocidura flavescens
 Flower's shrew, Crocidura floweri
 Bornean shrew, Crocidura foetida
 Fox's shrew, Crocidura foxi
 Southeast Asian shrew, Crocidura fuliginosa
 Savanna shrew, Crocidura fulvastra
 Smoky white-toothed shrew, Crocidura fumosa
 Bicolored musk shrew, Crocidura fuscomurina
 Glass's shrew, Crocidura glassi
 Gmelin's white-toothed shrew, Crocidura gmelini
 Goliath shrew, Crocidura goliath
 Peters's musk shrew, Crocidura gracilipes
 Large-headed shrew, Crocidura grandiceps
 Greater mindanao shrew, Crocidura grandis
 Grasse's shrew, Crocidura grassei
 Luzon shrew, Crocidura grayi
 Greenwood's shrew, Crocidura greenwoodi
 Harenna shrew, Crocidura harenna
 Hildegarde's shrew, Crocidura hildegardeae
 Hill's shrew, Crocidura hilliana
 Lesser red musk shrew, Crocidura hirta
 Andaman spiny shrew, Crocidura hispida
 Horsfield's shrew, Crocidura horsfieldii
 Hutan shrew, Crocidura hutanis
 North African white-toothed shrew, Crocidura ichnusae
 Indochinese shrew, Crocidura indochinensis
 Jackson's shrew, Crocidura jacksoni
 Jenkins' shrew, Crocidura jenkinsi
 Jouvenet's shrew, Crocidura jouvenetae
 Katinka's shrew, Crocidura katinka
 Kivu shrew, Crocidura kivuana
 Lamotte's shrew, Crocidura lamottei
 Kivu long-haired shrew, Crocidura lanosa
 Ussuri white-toothed shrew, Crocidura lasiura
 Latona's shrew, Crocidura latona
 Sulawesi shrew, Crocidura lea
 Sumatran giant shrew, Crocidura lepidura
 Bicolored shrew, Crocidura leucodon
 Sulawesi tiny shrew, Crocidura levicula
 Butiaba naked-tailed shrew, Crocidura littoralis
 Savanna swamp shrew, Crocidura longipes
 Lucina's shrew, Crocidura lucina
 Ludia's shrew, Crocidura ludia
 Moonshine shrew, Crocidura luna
 Mauritanian shrew, Crocidura lusitania
 MacArthur's shrew, Crocidura macarthuri
 MacMillan's shrew, Crocidura macmillani
 Nyiro shrew, Crocidura macowi
 Malayan shrew, Crocidura malayana
 Manenguba shrew, Crocidura manengubae
 Makwassie musk shrew, Crocidura maquassiensis
 Swamp musk shrew, Crocidura mariquensis
 Gracile naked-tailed shrew, Crocidura maurisca
 Javanese shrew, Crocidura maxi
 Mindoro shrew, Crocidura mindorus
 Sri Lankan long-tailed shrew, Crocidura miya
 Kilimanjaro shrew, Crocidura monax
 Sunda shrew, Crocidura monticola
 Montane white-toothed shrew, Crocidura montis
 West African long-tailed shrew, Crocidura muricauda
 Mossy forest shrew, Crocidura musseri
 Ugandan musk shrew, Crocidura mutesae
 Somali dwarf shrew, Crocidura nana
 Savanna dwarf shrew, Crocidura nanilla
 Peninsular shrew, Crocidura negligens
 Negros shrew, Crocidura negrina
 Nicobar shrew, Crocidura nicobarica
 Nigerian shrew, Crocidura nigeriae
 Blackish white-toothed shrew, Crocidura nigricans
 Black-footed shrew, Crocidura nigripes
 African black shrew, Crocidura nigrofusca
 Nimba shrew, Crocidura nimbae
 Niobe's shrew, Crocidura niobe
 West African pygmy shrew, Crocidura obscurior
 African giant shrew, Crocidura olivieri
 Oriental shrew, Crocidura orientalis
 Ryukyu shrew, Crocidura orii
 Palawan shrew, Crocidura palawanensis
 Sumatran long-tailed shrew, Crocidura paradoxura
 Small-footed shrew, Crocidura parvipes
 Sahelian tiny shrew, Crocidura pasha
 Pale gray shrew, Crocidura pergrisea
 Guramba shrew, Crocidura phaeura
 Cameroonian shrew, Crocidura picea
 Pitman's shrew, Crocidura pitmani
 Flat-headed shrew, Crocidura planiceps
 Fraser's musk shrew, Crocidura poensis
 Polia's shrew, Crocidura polia
 Kashmir white-toothed shrew, Crocidura pullata
 Rainey's shrew, Crocidura raineyi
 Negev shrew, Crocidura ramona
 Chinese white-toothed shrew, Crocidura rapax
 Egyptian pygmy shrew, Crocidura religiosa
 Sulawesi white-handed shrew, Crocidura rhoditis
 Roosevelt's shrew, Crocidura roosevelti
 Greater white-toothed shrew, Crocidura russula
 Ugandan lowland shrew, Crocidura selina
 Lesser rock shrew, Crocidura serezkyensis
 Asian lesser white-toothed shrew, Crocidura shantungensis
 Siberian shrew, Crocidura sibirica
 Sicilian shrew, Crocidura sicula
 Lesser gray-brown musk shrew, Crocidura silacea
 Desert musk shrew, Crocidura smithii
 Somali shrew, Crocidura somalica
 Kahuzi swamp shrew, Crocidura stenocephala
 Lesser white-toothed shrew, Crocidura suaveolens
 Iranian shrew, Crocidura susiana
 Tanzanian shrew, Crocidura tansaniana
 Tarella shrew, Crocidura tarella
 Saharan shrew, Crocidura tarfayensis
 Telford's shrew, Crocidura telfordi
 Timor shrew, Crocidura tenuis
 Thalia's shrew, Crocidura thalia
 Therese's shrew, Crocidura theresae
 São Tomé shrew, Crocidura thomensis
 Christmas Island shrew, Crocidura trichura
 Turbo shrew, Crocidura turba
 Ultimate shrew, Crocidura ultima
 Usambara shrew, Crocidura usambarae
 Savanna path shrew, Crocidura viaria
 Mamfe shrew, Crocidura virgata
 Voi shrew, Crocidura voi
 Voracious shrew, Crocidura vorax
 Banka shrew, Crocidura vosmaeri
 Lesser Ryukyu shrew, Crocidura watasei
 Whitaker's shrew, Crocidura whitakeri
 Wimmer's shrew, Crocidura wimmeri
 Hainan Island shrew, Crocidura wuchihensis
 Xanthippe's shrew, Crocidura xantippe
 Yankari shrew, Crocidura yankariensis
 Zaphir's shrew, Crocidura zaphiri
 Zarudny's rock shrew, Crocidura zarudnyi
 Upemba shrew, Crocidura zimmeri
 Cretan shrew, Crocidura zimmermanni
 Genus Diplomesodon
 Piebald shrew, Diplomesodon pulchellum
 Genus Feroculus
 Kelaart's long-clawed shrew, Feroculus feroculus
 Genus Paracrocidura, large-headed shrews
 Grauer's large-headed shrew, Paracrocidura graueri
 Greater large-headed shrew, Paracrocidura maxima
 Lesser large-headed shrew, Paracrocidura schoutedeni
 Genus Ruwenzorisorex
 Ruwenzori shrew, Ruwenzorisorex suncoides
 Genus Scutisorex
 Armored shrew, Scutisorex somereni
 Thor's hero shrew, Scutisorex thori
 Genus Solisorex
 Pearson's long-clawed shrew, Solisorex pearsoni
 Genus Suncus
 Taita shrew, Suncus aequatorius
 Black shrew, Suncus ater
 Day's shrew, Suncus dayi
 Etruscan shrew, Suncus etruscus
 Sri Lankan shrew, Suncus fellowesgordoni
 Bornean pygmy shrew, Suncus hosei
 Least dwarf shrew, Suncus infinitesimus
 Greater dwarf shrew, Suncus lixus
 Madagascan pygmy shrew, Suncus madagascariensis
 Malayan pygmy shrew, Suncus malayanus
 Climbing shrew, Suncus megalura
 Flores shrew, Suncus mertensi
 Asian highland shrew, Suncus montanus
 Asian house shrew, Suncus murinus
 Remy's pygmy shrew, Suncus remyi
 Anderson's shrew, Suncus stoliczkanus
 Lesser dwarf shrew, Suncus varilla
 Jungle shrew, Suncus zeylanicus
 Genus Sylvisorex, forest shrews
 Cameroonian forest shrew, Sylvisorex cameruniensis
 Grant's forest shrew, Sylvisorex granti
 Howell's forest shrew, Sylvisorex howelli
 Bioko forest shrew, Sylvisorex isabellae
 Johnston's forest shrew, Sylvisorex johnstoni
 Kongana shrew, Sylvisorex konganensis
 Moon forest shrew, Sylvisorex lunaris
 Mount Cameroon forest shrew, Sylvisorex morio
 Greater forest shrew, Sylvisorex ollula
 Lesser forest shrew, Sylvisorex oriundus
 Rain forest shrew, Sylvisorex pluvialis
 Volcano shrew, Sylvisorex vulcanorum

Subfamily Myosoricinae
 Genus Congosorex
 Greater Congo shrew, Congosorex polli
 Lesser Congo shrew, Congosorex verheyeni
 Genus Myosorex
 Babault's mouse shrew, Myosorex babaulti
 Montane mouse shrew, Myosorex blarina
 Dark-footed mouse shrew, Myosorex cafer
 Eisentraut's mouse shrew, Myosorex eisentrauti
 Geata mouse shrew, Myosorex geata
 Kihaule's mouse shrew, Myosorex kihaulei
 Long-tailed forest shrew, Myosorex longicaudatus
 Oku mouse shrew, Myosorex okuensis
 Rumpi mouse shrew, Myosorex rumpii
 Schaller's mouse shrew, Myosorex schalleri
 Sclater's mouse shrew, Myosorex sclateri
 Thin mouse shrew, Myosorex tenuis
 Forest shrew, Myosorex varius
 Kilimanjaro mouse shrew, Myosorex zinki
 Genus Surdisorex
 Aberdare mole shrew, Surdisorex norae
 Mt. Kenya mole shrew, Surdisorex polulus

Subfamily Soricinae

Tribe Anourosoricini
 Genus Anourosorex, mole shrews
 Assam mole shrew, Anourosorex assamensis
 Giant mole shrew, Anourosorex schmidi
 Chinese mole shrew, Anourosorex squamipes
 Taiwanese mole shrew, Anourosorex yamashinai

Tribe Blarinellini
 Genus Blarinella, Asiatic short-tailed shrews
 Indochinese short-tailed shrew, Blarinella griselda
 Asiatic short-tailed shrew, Blarinella quadraticauda
 Burmese short-tailed shrew, Blarinella wardi

Tribe Blarinini
 Genus Blarina, American short-tailed shrews
 Northern short-tailed shrew, Blarina brevicauda
 Southern short-tailed shrew, Blarina carolinensis
 Elliot's short-tailed shrew, Blarina hylophaga
 Everglades short-tailed shrew, Blarina peninsulae
 Genus Cryptotis, small-eared shrews
 Mexican small-eared shrew, Cryptotis mexicana
 Nelson's small-eared shrew, Cryptotis nelsoni
 Grizzled small-eared shrew, Cryptotis obscura
 Phillips' small-eared shrew, Cryptotis phillipsii
 Central Mexican broad-clawed shrew, Cryptotis alticola
 Goldman's broad-clawed shrew, Cryptotis goldmani
 Goodwin's broad-clawed shrew, Cryptotis goodwini
 Guatemalan broad-clawed shrew, Cryptotis griseoventris
 Oaxacan broad-clawed shrew, Cryptotis peregrina
 Eastern Cordillera small-footed shrew, Cryptotis brachyonyx
 Colombian small-footed shrew, Cryptotis colombiana
 Honduran small-eared shrew, Cryptotis hondurensis
 Yucatan small-eared shrew, Cryptotis mayensis
 Darién small-eared shrew, Cryptotis mera
 Merriam's small-eared shrew, Cryptotis merriami
 Blackish small-eared shrew, Cryptotis nigrescens
 Ecuadorean small-eared shrew, Cryptotis equatoris
 Medellín small-eared shrew, Cryptotis medellinia
 Merida small-eared shrew, Cryptotis meridensis
 Wandering small-eared shrew, Cryptotis montivaga
 Peruvian small-eared shrew, Cryptotis peruviensis
 Western Colombian small-eared shrew, Cryptotis squamipes
 Tamá small-eared shrew, Cryptotis tamensis
 Thomas' small-eared shrew, Cryptotis thomasi
 Central American least shrew, Cryptotis orophila
 North American least shrew, Cryptotis parva
 Tropical small-eared shrew, Cryptotis tropicalis
 Enders's small-eared shrew, Cryptotis endersi
 Talamancan small-eared shrew, Cryptotis gracilis
 Big Mexican small-eared shrew, Cryptotis magna

Tribe Nectogalini
 Genus Chimarrogale, Asiatic water shrews
 Malayan water shrew, Chimarrogale hantu
 Himalayan water shrew, Chimarrogale himalayica
 Bornean water shrew, Chimarrogale phaeura
 Japanese water shrew, Chimarrogale platycephalus
 Chinese water shrew, Chimarrogale styani
 Sumatran water shrew, Chimarrogale sumatrana
 Genus Chodsigoa
 Van Sung's shrew, Chodsigoa cauvansunga
 De Winton's shrew, Chodsigoa hypsibia
 Lamulate shrew, Chodsigoa lamula
 Lowe's shrew, Chodsigoa parca
 Pygmy brown-toothed shrew, Chodsigoa parva
 Salenski's shrew, Chodsigoa salenskii
 Smith's shrew, Chodsigoa smithii
 Lesser Taiwanese shrew, Chodsigoa sodalis
 Genus Episoriculus
 Hodgsons's brown-toothed shrew, Episoriculus caudatus
 Taiwanese brown-toothed shrew, Episoriculus fumidus
 Long-tailed brown-toothed shrew, Episoriculus leucops
 Long-tailed mountain shrew, Episoriculus macrurus
 Genus Nectogale
 Elegant water shrew, Nectogale elegans
 Genus Neomys, Eurasian water shrews
 Mediterranean water shrew, Neomys anomalus
 Eurasian water shrew, Neomys fodiens
 Transcaucasian water shrew, Neomys teres
 Genus Nesiotites
 Balearic shrew, Nesiotites hidalgo
 Sardinian shrew, Nesiotites similis
 Genus Soriculus
 Himalayan shrew, Soriculus nigrescens

Tribe Notiosoricini
 Genus Megasorex
 Mexican shrew, Megasorex gigas
 Genus Notiosorex
 Cockrum's gray shrew, Notiosorex cockrumi 
 Crawford's gray shrew, Notiosorex crawfordi
 Large-eared gray shrew, Notiosorex evotis
 Villa's gray shrew, Notiosorex villai

Tribe Soricini
 Genus Sorex, long-tailed shrews
 Glacier Bay water shrew, Sorex alaskanus 
 Alpine shrew, Sorex alpinus 
 Valais shrew, Sorex antinorii
 Common shrew, Sorex araneus 
 Arctic shrew, Sorex arcticus 
 Arizona shrew, Sorex arizonae
 Udine shrew, Sorex arunchi 
 Tien Shan shrew, Sorex asper
 Dneper common shrew, Sorex averini 
 Baird's shrew, Sorex bairdii 
 Lesser striped shrew, Sorex bedfordiae 
 Marsh shrew, Sorex bendirii 
 Buchara shrew, Sorex buchariensis 
 Laxmann's shrew, Sorex caecutiens 
 Kamchatka shrew, Sorex camtschatica 
 Gansu shrew, Sorex cansulus 
 Cinereus shrew, Sorex cinereus 
 Millet's shrew, Sorex coronatus 
 Stripe-backed shrew, Sorex cylindricauda 
 Siberian large-toothed shrew, Sorex daphaenodon 
 Long-tailed shrew, Sorex dispar 
 Zacatecas shrew, Sorex emarginatus 
 Chinese highland shrew, Sorex excelsus 
 Smoky shrew, Sorex fumeus 
 Slender shrew, Sorex gracillimus 
 Iberian shrew, Sorex granarius 
 Prairie shrew, Sorex haydeni 
 Azumi shrew, Sorex hosonoi 
 American pygmy shrew, Sorex hoyi 
 Taiga shrew, Sorex isodon 
 Saint Lawrence Island shrew, Sorex jacksoni 
 Kozlov's shrew, Sorex kozlovi 
 Paramushir shrew, Sorex leucogaster 
 Southeastern shrew, Sorex longirostris 
 Mount Lyell shrew, Sorex lyelli
 Large-toothed shrew, Sorex macrodon
 Maritime shrew, Sorex maritimensis
 Merriam's shrew, Sorex merriami
 Carmen mountain shrew, Sorex milleri 
 Eurasian least shrew, Sorex minutissimus 
 Eurasian pygmy shrew, Sorex minutus 
 Ussuri shrew, Sorex mirabilis 
 Dusky shrew, Sorex monticolus 
 Dwarf shrew, Sorex nanus 
 New Mexico shrew, Sorex neomexicanus
 Mexican long-tailed shrew, Sorex oreopolus 
 Orizaba long-tailed shrew, Sorex orizabae
 Ornate shrew, Sorex ornatus 
 Pacific shrew, Sorex pacificus 
 American water shrew, Sorex palustris 
 Kashmir pygmy shrew, Sorex planiceps 
 Portenko's shrew, Sorex portenkoi 
 Preble's shrew, Sorex preblei 
 Pribilof Island shrew, Sorex pribilofensis
 Radde's shrew, Sorex raddei 
 Flat-skulled shrew, Sorex roboratus 
 Apennine shrew, Sorex samniticus 
 Caucasian shrew, Sorex satunini 
 Saussure's shrew, Sorex saussurei 
 Sclater's shrew, Sorex sclateri 
 Shinto shrew, Sorex shinto 
 Chinese shrew, Sorex sinalis 
 Fog shrew, Sorex sonomae 
 San Cristobal shrew, Sorex stizodon 
 Inyo shrew, Sorex tenellus 
 Tibetan shrew, Sorex thibetanus 
 Trowbridge's shrew, Sorex trowbridgii 
 Tundra shrew, Sorex tundrensis 
 Barren ground shrew, Sorex ugyunak 
 Long-clawed shrew, Sorex unguiculatus 
 Vagrant shrew, Sorex vagrans
 Chestnut-bellied shrew, Sorex ventralis
 Veracruz shrew, Sorex veraecrucis
 Verapaz shrew, Sorex veraepacis
 Caucasian pygmy shrew, Sorex volnuchini
 Alaska tiny shrew, Sorex yukonicus

Family Talpidae, moles and desmans

Subfamily Scalopinae

Tribe Condylurini
 Genus Condylura
 Star-nosed mole, Condylura cristata

Tribe Scalopini
 Genus Alpiscaptulus
Medog mole, Alpiscaptulus medogensis
Genus Parascalops
 Hairy-tailed mole, Parascalops breweri
 Genus Scalopus
 Eastern mole, Scalopus aquaticus
 Genus Scapanulus
 Gansu mole, Scapanulus oweni
 Genus Scapanus
 Mexican mole, Scapanus anthonyi
 Northern broad-footed mole, Scapanus latimanus
 Southern broad-footed mole, Scapanus occultus
 Coast mole, Scapanus orarius
 Townsend's mole, Scapanus townsendii

Subfamily Talpinae

Tribe Desmanini
 Genus Desmana
 Russian desman, Desmana moschata
 Genus Galemys
 Pyrenean desman, Galemys pyrenaicus

Tribe Neurotrichini
 Genus Neurotrichus
 Shrew-mole, Neurotrichus gibbsii

Tribe Scaptonychini
 Genus Scaptonyx
 Long-tailed mole, Scaptonyx fusicaudus

Tribe Talpini
 Genus Euroscaptor
 Greater Chinese mole, Euroscaptor grandis
 Kloss's mole, Euroscaptor klossi
 Kuznetsov's mole, Euroscaptor kuznetsovi
 Long-nosed mole, Euroscaptor longirostris
 Malaysian mole, Euroscaptor malayanus 
 Himalayan mole, Euroscaptor micrurus
 Ngoc Linh mole, Euroscaptor ngoclinhensis
 Orlov's mole, Euroscaptor orlovi
 Small-toothed mole, Euroscaptor parvidens
 Vietnamese mole, Euroscaptor subanura

Genus Mogera
 Echigo mole, Mogera etigo
 Small Japanese mole, Mogera imaizumii
 Insular mole, Mogera insularis
 Kano's mole, Mogera kanoana
 La Touche's mole, Mogera latouchei
 Ussuri mole, Mogera robusta
 Sado mole, Mogera tokudae
 Japanese mole, Mogera wogura
 Senkaku mole, Mogera uchidai
 Genus Parascaptor
 White-tailed mole, Parascaptor leucura
 Genus Scaptochirus
 Short-faced mole, Scaptochirus moschatus
 Genus Talpa
 Altai mole, Talpa altaica
Aquitanian mole, Talpa aquitania
Blind mole, Talpa caeca
 Caucasian mole, Talpa caucasica
 European mole, Talpa europaea
 Père David's mole, Talpa davidiana
 Levant mole, Talpa levantis
Martino's mole, Talpa martinorum
 Spanish mole, Talpa occidentalis
Ognev's mole, Talpa ognevi
 Roman mole, Talpa romana
 Balkan mole, Talpa stankovici
Talysch mole, Talpa talyschensis

Tribe Urotrichini
 Genus Dymecodon
 True's shrew mole, Dymecodon pilirostris
 Genus Urotrichus
 Japanese shrew mole, Urotrichus talpoides

Subfamily Uropsilinae
 Genus Uropsilus
 Equivalent-teeth shrew mole, Uropsilus aequodonenia
 Anderson's shrew mole, Uropsilus andersoni
 Black-backed shrew mole, Uropsilus atronates
 Dabie Mountains shrew mole, Uropsilus dabieshanensis
 Gracile shrew mole, Uropsilus gracilis
 Inquisitive shrew mole, Uropsilus investigator
 Snow Mountain shrew mole, Uropsilus nivatus
 Chinese shrew mole, Uropsilus soricipes

See also 
 Mammal classification

References 

 
Soricomorpha
Soricomorpha